Rwandan literature is literature both oral and written in Kinyarwanda, or French, particularly by citizens of Rwanda.

Background
Rwanda's literary history is largely an oral one.  The traditional texts were classed in two main categories: more formal, royal documents, which are described as 'official tradition', and the non-formal, popular literature.  The distinction between these categories is based on whether or not the literature was controlled officially, rather than denoting any sort of value judgment regarding the content.

To this day, storytelling and public speaking are much admired, and good storytellers are respected in society.

Very little literature has been written in Kinyarwanda (the native language of the country), but there are a number of books written in French.  The clergyman and historian Alexis Kagame (1912–81) researched the oral history of Rwanda and published a number of volumes of poetry and Rwandan mythology. Saverio Naigiziki wrote an autobiography, Escapade rwandaise (Rwandan Adventure) and a novel, L'Optimiste (The Optimist), about the marriage of a Hutu man and a Tutsi woman.

In the aftermath of the 1994 genocide, Benjamin Sehene (b.1959) wrote Le Piège ethnique (The Ethnic Trap) (1999), a study of what led to the genocide. He also wrote Le Feu sous la soutane (Fire under the Cassock) (2005), an historical novel focusing on the true story of a Hutu Catholic priest, Father Stanislas, who offered protection to Tutsi refugees in his church before sexually exploiting the women and participating in massacres.

Rwandan writers and dramatists

 Alexis Kagame
 Scholastique Mukasonga
 Saverio Naigiki
 Benjamin Sehene

Works

 Our Lady of the Nile

See also

 Culture of Rwanda
 Music of Rwanda

References